Moldova sent a delegation to participate at the 2020 Summer Paralympics in Tokyo, Japan, from 24 August to 5 September 2021. This was the Eastern European's country Seventh appearance in the Summer Paralympic Games since their debut twenty four years prior at the 1996 Summer Paralympics. Moldova sent six athletes to these Games, shot put thrower Oxana Spataur and Vladimir Butucea, powerlifter Larisa Marinenkova and Denis Raiul, Judo Player Oleg Creţul and Ion Basoc.

Background
Moldova first appeared in Paralympic competition at the 1996 Summer Paralympics. They have competed in every Summer Paralympic Games since, making Tokyo its Seventh appearance at a Summer Paralympiad. They have never participated in the Winter Paralympic Games, but have won two medals (one each in athletics and table tennis) at the Summer Paralympics. The 2020 Summer Paralympics were held from 24 August to 5 September 2021 with a total of 4403 athletes representing 162 National Paralympic Committees taking part.

Disability classification

Every participant at the Paralympics has their disability grouped into one of five disability categories; amputation, the condition may be congenital or sustained through injury or illness; cerebral palsy; wheelchair athletes, there is often overlap between this and other categories; visual impairment, including blindness; Les autres, any physical disability that does not fall strictly under one of the other categories, for example dwarfism or multiple sclerosis. Each Paralympic sport then has its own classifications, dependent upon the specific physical demands of competition. Events are given a code, made of numbers and letters, describing the type of event and classification of the athletes competing. Some sports, such as athletics, divide athletes by both the category and severity of their disabilities, other sports, for example swimming, group competitors from different categories together, the only separation being based on the severity of the disability.

Competitors
The following is the list of number of competitors participating in the Games:

Athletics

Field Events — Men

Field Events — Women

Judo

Powerlifting

Men

Women

See also
Moldova at the 2020 Summer Olympics

References

Nations at the 2020 Summer Paralympics
2020
2020 in Moldova